Lake Lucerne (Vierwaldstättersee) is a lake in Switzerland.

Lake Lucerne or Lake Luzerne may also refer to:

Lakes 
 Lake Lucerne (California)
 Lake Lucerne (Polk County, Florida), a small lake north of Winter Haven
 Lake Luzerne (New York)
 Lake Lucerne (Wisconsin)

Communities 
Lake Lucerne, Florida, neighborhood in Miami Gardens
Lake Luzerne, New York, a town
Lake Luzerne (CDP), New York, hamlet within the town

See also
 Lucerne (disambiguation)